The Good Soldier Schweik is a 1956 Czechoslovak anti-war comedy film written and directed by Karel Steklý. It was based on the novel The Good Soldier Švejk by Jaroslav Hašek and was nominated for the 1957 Crystal Globe Awards. It was followed by a 1957 sequel I Dutifully Report.

Cast
 Rudolf Hrušínský as Josef Švejk
 František Filipovský as Agent Bretschneider
 Svatopluk Beneš as First lieutenant Lukáš
 Josef Hlinomaz as Innkeeper Palivec
 Miloš Kopecký as Chaplain Otto Katz
 Božena Havlíčková as Katy Wendlerová
 Eva Svobodová as Ms. Müllerová
 Felix Le Breux as Police council

References

External links
 

1957 films
1950s war comedy films
Czechoslovak comedy films
1950s Czech-language films
The Good Soldier Švejk
Films based on Czech novels
Films based on works by Jaroslav Hašek
Films directed by Karel Steklý
Czech war comedy films
Anti-war comedy films
Film remakes
1957 comedy films
Czech World War I films
1950s Czech films